Thunderdelve Mountain is an adventure module published in 1985 for the Dungeons & Dragons fantasy role-playing game.

Plot summary
Thunderdelve Mountain is a solo adventure scenario for a dwarf player character who must defeat a monster alone. The module also instructions for running the adventure with a full party of characters instead.

The player characters must fight Fyrsnaca, a fire breathing worm. The module includes new monsters: vapor ghouls, red worms and the Fyrsnaca.

Publication history
XS2 Thunderdelve Mountain was written by William Carlson, with a cover by Larry Elmore, and was published by TSR in 1985 as a 40-page booklet with an outer folder.

Reception

Reviews

References

Dungeons & Dragons modules
Dwarves in popular culture
Mystara
Role-playing game supplements introduced in 1985